The Copa Fraternidad 1971 was the first Central American club championship played between six clubs, two from Costa Rica, two from El Salvador and two from Guatemala. This was the first edition under this format.

Teams

Standings

Results

Champion

External links
RSSSF - Copa Fraternidad

1971
1
1970–71 in Costa Rican football
1970–71 in Salvadoran football
1970–71 in Guatemalan football